Bob Campbell was a Scottish-American soccer right half who spent four seasons in the American Soccer League.

Campbell began his career with the amateur Clan McGregor in the Boston leagues.  In 1926, he signed with the Springfield Babes of the American Soccer League.  When Springfield withdrew from the league due to financial problems, Campbell moved to Providence for the end of the season.  That year he finished twenty-ninth on the league scoring table, his best season statistically.  He continued to play for Providence until 1930.

External links

References

American soccer players
Association football midfielders
Providence Clamdiggers players
Springfield Babes players
American Soccer League (1921–1933) players
Year of birth missing
Year of death missing